This is a list of NGC objects 6001–7000 from the New General Catalogue (NGC). The astronomical catalogue is composed mainly of star clusters, nebulae, and galaxies. Other objects in the catalogue can be found in the other subpages of the list of NGC objects.

The constellation information in these tables is taken from The Complete New General Catalogue and Index Catalogue of Nebulae and Star Clusters by J. L. E. Dreyer, which was accessed using the "VizieR Service". Galaxy types are identified using the NASA/IPAC Extragalactic Database. The other data of these tables are from the SIMBAD Astronomical Database unless otherwise stated.

6001–6100

6101–6200

6201–6300

6301–6400

6401–6500

6501–6600

6601–6700

6701–6800

6801–6900

6901–7000

See also
 Lists of astronomical objects

References

 7
NGC objects 6001-7000